Nimfa Cuesta Vilches was a Senior Deputy Court Administrator (DCA) at the Office of the Court Administrator (OCA), Supreme Court of the Philippines. She was a regional trial court judge in Manila until her appointment as Assistant Court Administrator in 2006 and as DCA in 2008. She was a family law expert in the Philippines and in the international legal community.

Profile
Born to lawyer-father, Benito R. Cuesta I, and an educator mother, Corazon Go, in Tacloban City, Leyte, Philippines on October 6, 1956, Vilches graduated class valedictorian in elementary school and a Gerry Roxas Leadership and Scholarship Awardee in secondary school. She obtained her undergraduate degree in political science at the Jesuit Ateneo de Manila University in 1978 and her Bachelor of Laws at the Ateneo de Manila Law School in 1982. Vilches was a member of the faculty of the Ateneo de Manila Law School and held the Chief Justice Ramon Avancena Professorial Chair in Civil Law. She joined the Supreme Court after her admission to the practice of law in 1983 as Court Attorney to then-Senior Justices Hermogenes Concepcion, Jr.; Jose Y. Feria; and Teodoro Padilla.

Vilches was the second of four daughters. She was married to Salvador C. Vilches, a mediation consultant, with whom she had two children- Steve and Nicole.

In 1989, at the age of 32, Vilches was appointed Presiding Judge of the Municipal Trial Court of Barugo, Leyte, and was later designated by the Supreme Court as Acting Judge in the Metropolitan Trial Courts of Manila, Makati and Caloocan to address clogged court dockets until her appointment as Presiding Judge, Regional Trial Court of Manila, Branch 48, in 1999. In recognition of her notable performance as a regional trial court judge, the Judicial and Bar Council (JBC), Supreme Court, nominated her to the post of Associate Justice of the Court of Appeals in 2004. On September 26, 2006, she was awarded Outstanding Regional Trial Court Judge by the Society for Judicial Excellence, Supreme Court, for exceptional performance as a magistrate for 17 years and for advancing the rights of women and children. She was promoted Assistant Court Administrator the following day September 27, 2006.

As Vice-Chairperson and chief implementer of the "Justice on Wheels", an access to justice by the marginalized sectors program of the Supreme Court from 2008 to 2010, she organized the conduct of court hearings inside mobile court buses in faraway courts with no judges, and in urban courthouses with high criminal dockets, that lead to the release of 5,157 detained prisoners; and introduced the “mobile court-annexed mediation (MCAM)” initiative that brought about the successful settlement (with 96% success rate) of 6,830 pending civil cases.

Vilches, in 2005, ruled on the trailblazing case (Herrera v. Alba and Hon. Nimfa Cuesta Vilches, G.R. No. 148220, June 15, 2005) on the admissibility of DNA evidence in Philippine courts. The decision was affirmed in its entirety on appeal and was much quoted by the Supreme Court. That piece of verdict became one of the starting points of the 2007 Supreme Court Rule on DNA Evidence.

In 1999, Vilches founded the CASA-GAL Program in the Philippines composed of trained community volunteers for children in court that was chosen by UNICEF in 2005 as one of the innovative initiatives for children in Asia and the Pacific. For her outstanding service to the public, Vilches was conferred the 2009 Presidential Lingkod Bayan Award by the Civil Service Commission of the Philippines, the highest recognition given to a government official or employee.

Notable positions and achievements

Supreme Court committees
 Chairperson, Committee on Legal Fees, Office of the Court Administrator
 Chairperson, Ad hoc Committee for Legal Fees
 Chairperson, Grievance Committee, OCA
 Chairperson, Personnel Evaluation and Review Committee, OCA
 Chairperson, Subcommittee on Justice for Children, Office of the President, Manila
 Vice-Chairperson, Justice on Wheels Committee
 Vice-Chairperson, Legal Research and Method, Philippine Judicial Academy (PhilJA)
 Member, Sub-Committee for Family Courts, Committee on Revision of Rules
 Member, Committee on the Revision of the Benchbook, PhilJA
 Member, Selection and Promotion Board, OCA
 Member, Committee on Gender Responsiveness in the Judiciary
 Member, Research Group, PhilJA

Academe
 Professor II, Philippine Judicial Academy, Supreme Court of the Philippines
 Professor, Ateneo de Manila Law School and holder of the Chief Justice Ramón Avanceña Professorial Chair in Civil Law since 2003
 Lecturer for the Mandatory Continuing Legal Education (MCLE) for the University of the Philippines Institute of Judicial Administration; Integrated Bar of the Philippines (IBP); Philippine Bar Association (PBA); Department of Justice (DOJ); and the Public Attorneys Office (PAO)

International lectures
 Delegate, Philippine Delegation to the UN General Assembly Special Session on Children, New York City, USA, 2003
 Plenary lecturer, “Trafficking in Women and Children” and Session Chair, “Trafficking in Children,” 4th International Conference on Family Law and Children's Rights, Cape Town, South Africa, 2003
 Lecturer, Asian Conference of Social Work Professionals, Kuala Lumpur, Malaysia, 2003
 Lecturer, “Making Juvenile Justice Work,” International Conference on Children's Rights, University of Ottawa, Canada, 2007
 Lecturer, “Phenomena in Juvenile Delinquency,” International Juvenile Justice Observatory (OIJJ), Seville, Spain, 2007
 Lecturer, “Family Mediation,”1st Asian Mediation Association, Singapore, 2009
 Lecturer, “No-Nonsense Court Management,” International Association of Court Administrators Asia-Pacific Conference, Bogor, Indonesia, March 13–16, 2011.

Works published
 B.P. 22: FAQs, Rex Bookstore, 2005
 Are You Ready To Be A CASA/GAL Volunteer? 2001
 DNA and the Courts, 2002
 Trafficking In Women and Children, 2003
 Making Juvenile Justice Work, 2004
 Mediation: Reaching its Potential in Family Law Cases, 2006
 No Nonsense Court Management, 2007
 RA 9184 or the Government Procurement Reform Act: Bane or Boon, 2008
 ADR: The Solutionist Approach to Unclog Court Dockets, 2009

Scholarships and training
 Oxford University, England, Children's Rights: Moving Forward, sponsored by the British Council, 2001
 Hertfordshire, England, Violence against Women: Tackling Trafficking, sponsored by the British Council, 2004
 National Council of Juvenile and Family Court Judges, Nevada, Role of the Judge in a Family Court, sponsored by UNICEF Manila, 1999
 National Council of Juvenile and Family Court Judges, Nevada, Evidence in Family Court, sponsored by the Supreme Court of the Philippines and City of Manila, 2000
 Legal and Social Systems of Sweden, sponsored by Swedish International Development Aid, 2005
 National Judicial Institute of Canada, Vancouver and Kelowna, British Columbia, Evidence, sponsored by the Canadian International Development Aid, 2006
 National Center for State Courts, Orlando Florida USA, Court Management, sponsored by the USAID and The Asia Foundation, 2007

See also
Ateneo Law School

References

External links
 DCA Nimfa C. Vilches: Keeps on Rolling
The Casa/Gal Volunteer Program Jurisdiction: Philippines
 Issue Focus: Enhancing Legal Tools to Protect People's Rights
 The Asia Foundation : Projects : Search - 49k
 JUSTICE FOR CHILDREN: DETENTION AS A LAST RESORT Innovative Initiatives in the East Asia and Pacific Region
 GENERAL COMMITTEE - International Association Of Youth And Family Judges And Magistrates
 UP Newsletter - University Of The Philippines System
 Gender Equality Rights
 :: Malaya - The National Newspaper ::
 International Juvenile Justice Observatory - IJJO
 Ateneo Law Journal
 DOST - National Academy of Science and Technology
 About the Author
 DNA Technology and Philippine Courts
 Trafficking Of Women And Children
 CRIN - Child Rights Information Network - Resources -
 PIA daily news in English, Tagalog, Cebuano, Hiligaynon, Ilocano, Waray, Pangalatok from around the Philippines
 NIJ Special Report
 Sun.Star Davao - 'Counsels of no choice'
 : : : Philippine Judicial Academy : : :
 CONTENTS 
 FIRST AUSTRALASIAN  JUDICIAL EDUCATORS FORUM
 Resources
 Child Protection in the Philippines | Monthly Features
 APJR Online
 PAO
 City of Manila - Lungsod ng Maynila *Website of Manila, Phi lippines* - Mayor Alfredo S. Lim

1956 births
2011 deaths
20th-century Filipino lawyers
People from Tacloban
Ateneo de Manila University alumni
Academic staff of Ateneo de Manila University
21st-century Filipino lawyers
Filipino women judges
Justices of the Court of Appeals of the Philippines